Parasphenarina is a genus of brachiopods belonging to the family Frieleiidae.

Species:

Parasphenarina cavernicola 
Parasphenarina ezogremena

References

Brachiopod genera